The Strongest is a 1920 American silent drama film directed by Raoul Walsh and starring Renée Adorée, Carlo Liten, Harrison Hunter, Beatrice Noyes, Florence Malone, and Jean Gauthier DeTrigny. It is based on the 1919 French novel Les Plus Fort by Georges Clemenceau. The film was released by Fox Film Corporation in February 1920.

Cast
Renée Adorée as Claudia
Carlo Liten as Henri
Harrison Hunter as Harle
Beatrice Noyes as Betty Macklin
Florence Malone as Claire Harle
Jean Gauthier DeTrigny as Visconte
Madame Tressida as Nanette
Jean Gauthier as Visconte
Georgette Gauthier DeTrigny as Comtesse
Hal Horne as Maurice
James A. Marcus as Curate
C.A. de Lima as Prefect of Police
Teddy Piper

Preservation
The film is now considered lost.

References

External links

1920 drama films
Silent American drama films
1920 films
American silent feature films
American black-and-white films
Fox Film films
Films based on French novels
Lost American films
1920 lost films
Lost drama films
1920s American films